Tungsten(VI) oxytetrabromide  is the inorganic compound with the formula WOBr4. This a red-brown, hygroscopic solid sublimes at elevated temperatures.  It forms adducts with Lewis bases.  The solid consists of weakly associated square pyramidal monomers.  The related tungsten(VI) oxytetrachloride has been more heavily studied. The compound is usually classified as an oxyhalide.

References

Tungsten compounds
Oxobromides